Yoon Seung-min (born January 23, 2000), known professionally as Mudd the Student (stylized as Mudd the student), is a South Korean rapper and singer-songwriter. He first garnered attention when he appeared on the rap competition TV show Show Me the Money 10 in 2021.

Early life 
Yoon Seung-min was born on January 23, 2000, in Anyang, Gyeonggi and grew up in Gijang, Busan. In 2019, he applied to the Vans "Musician Wanted" contest and was selected as the Top 5. Later that year, he moved to Seoul to pursue his music career.

He adopted the stage name "Mudd the Student" because he likes how "Mudd" sounds and "Student" reflects his motto that everything has something to learn from.

Career

2019-2021: Show Me the Money 10 
In December 2019, Mudd the Student released his debut mixtape Mudd.

In June 2021, he released his debut EP Field Trip. In October 2021, he appeared on the rap competition TV show Show Me the Money 10 where he released the single "Breathe" with rappers Anandelight, Unofficialboyy, Be'O, and Geegooin. It became his most successful single, peaking at number one on the Gaon Digital Chart. He also released the singles "Moss" and "Dissonance" on the show and finished in the Top 8.

Artistry 
Mudd the Student describes his music as "alternative K-pop" or rock music with elements of electronica, hip hop and pop. It is characterized by abstract and complex sounds such as machine sounds and bizarre sound effects.

He cited indie rock bands Pavement, Dinosaur Jr. and Sonic Youth as his biggest influence.

Discography

EP

Mixtape

Singles

Filmography

TV

Awards and nominations

References

External links 
 
2000 births
Living people
Show Me the Money (South Korean TV series) contestants
South Korean male singer-songwriters